Ethmia caradjae is a moth in the family Depressariidae. It was described by Rebel in 1907. It is found in Asia Minor (Taurus Mountains), Iraq, Kurdistan and south-western Iran.

The forewings are glossy grey-brown with four black dots on the cell in two oblique parallel pairs. The hindwings are lightly scaled and transparent except near the termen, where the grey-brown scales are thicker.

References

Moths described in 1907
caradjae